Michael W. Crooke (born February 25, 1957) is an American businessman and academic. Crooke was CEO of Patagonia, Inc. from 1999 to 2005. From 2010 to 2015, Crooke served on the faculty of Pepperdine University's Graziadio School of Business and Management. Crooke also worked at the University of Oregon's Lundquist College of Business from 2015-2017.

Early life and education 
Crooke was raised in Eugene, Oregon and attended Aloha High School (graduating class of 1975). 

He earned a degree in Forestry and an MBA from Humboldt State University, and also received with a Ph.D. from Claremont Graduate University.

Career 
Crooke became CEO of Pearl Izumi in 1998. Crooke was recruited by founder Yvon Chouinard to be CEO of Lost Arrow Corporation and Patagonia, Inc. in 1999.  He left Patagonia to serve as CEO at Revolution Living backed by AOL-founder, Steve Case.

Academia 
From 2010 to 2015, Crooke served on the faculty of Pepperdine University's Graziadio School of Business and Management.

Crooke also worked at the University of Oregon's Lundquist College of Business from 2015-2017 as the Avamere Professor of Practice and founding faculty of Advanced Strategy.

References 

Living people
United States Navy SEALs personnel
1957 births
People from Ojai, California
American chief executives of fashion industry companies
People from Greater Los Angeles
People from Ventura County, California
California State Polytechnic University, Humboldt alumni
Claremont Graduate University alumni